COMVERT is a clothing manufacturer and distribution company based in Milan.
It designs, markets and distributes the bastard apparel brand and takes care of Electric eyewear and Baco magazine distribution in Italy.

References

Clothing companies of Italy
Companies based in Milan
Privately held companies of Italy